Fortum Klaipėda Combined Heat and Power Plant is power plant in Klaipėda, Lithuania and it uses biomass and waste to produce energy. It built in Klaipėda Free Economic Zone by Fortum Heat Lithuania which belongs to Finnish energy company Fortum.

Lithuanian president Dalia Grybauskaitė and Finnish president Sauli Niinistö both participated in the opening ceremony of the plant.

References

Energy infrastructure completed in 2013
2013 establishments in Lithuania
Cogeneration power stations in Lithuania
Biofuel power stations in Lithuania
Buildings and structures in Klaipėda
Waste power stations in Lithuania
Klaipėda Combined Heat and Power Plant